The Blackout is a 1997 American drama film directed by Abel Ferrara and starring Matthew Modine. It was screened out of competition at the 1997 Cannes Film Festival.

Plot

Matty is an actor and popular film star who is tired of Hollywood life and moves to Miami, where he makes a marriage proposal to his French girlfriend Annie. She is not ready to marry him, and it is revealed that she had an abortion. Depressed because he lost his baby (though it was he who initially asked for abortion), Matty, together with his friend Micky, go out for a wild night. At a nightclub, they meet a young waitress also named Annie and at the end of the night Matty passes out.

A year and a half later, Matty lives in New York, leads a clean life visiting AA meetings and has a relationship with an attractive model named Susan. He is still obsessed with his former girlfriend Annie, and about the mysterious missing part of his night back in Miami. Matty travels back to Miami to look up some old friends as well as try to find Annie 2 (the waitress), who vanished without a trace. Matty eventually learns that some secrets from his past are best left unrevealed.

Cast
 Matthew Modine – Matty
 Claudia Schiffer – Susan
 Béatrice Dalle – Annie 1
 Sarah Lassez – Annie 2
 Dennis Hopper – Mickey Wayne
 Steven Bauer – Mickey's Studio Actor
 Laura Bailey – Mickey's Studio Actress
 Nancy Ferrara – Mickey's Studio Actress
 Andrew Fiscella – Mickey's Studio Actor (as Andy Fiscella)
 Vincent Lamberti – Mickey's Studio Actor
 Victoria Duffy – Script Girl
 Nicholas De Cegli – Miami Drug Dealer
 Daphne Duplaix – Fly Girl (Daphne)
 Mercy Lopez – Fly Girl (Jasmine)
 Lori Eastside – That Girl
 Shareef Malnik – Gold Carder
 Peter Cannold – Movie Investor

References

External links

1997 films
1997 drama films
1990s English-language films
American drama films
Destination Films films
Films about actors
Films directed by Abel Ferrara
Films produced by Clayton Townsend
Films scored by Joe Delia
Films set in Miami
1990s American films
English-language drama films